Ouleout Creek is a river in Delaware County, New York. It flows through East Sidney Lake before converging with the Susquehanna River east-northeast of Unadilla.

References

Rivers of New York (state)
Rivers of Delaware County, New York
Tributaries of the Susquehanna River